Corna or Korna was a town of ancient Lycaonia, inhabited in Byzantine times. It became a bishopric; no longer the seat of a residential bishop, it remains a titular see of the Roman Catholic Church.

Its site is tentatively located near Dinorna hüyük, known as Orhaniye in Akören district, Konya Province Turkey.

References

Populated places in ancient Lycaonia
Catholic titular sees in Asia
Former populated places in Turkey
Populated places of the Byzantine Empire
History of Konya Province